Shanmugha Raja, known professionally as Mysskin,  is an Tamil film director, screenwriter, actor, singer, and producer.

He made his directorial debut in 2006 with Chithiram Pesudhadi. His subsequent films Anjathe (2008), Nandalala (2010) and Onaayum Aattukkuttiyum (2013) and Pisaasu (2014) received critical acclaim. He made his acting debut with Nandalala (2010), where he portrayed a mentally disabled man. In 2023 he debuted as music director in the tamil movie named as Devil.

Career 
He chose Mysskin as his assumed name, inspired by Prince Myshkin, the protagonist in Dostoevsky's novel The Idiot. His schooling was in Tamil and he is an avid book reader He was working in a book store when director Kathir first asked him to join him. He was with him for nearly 8 months but did not work in any movie. It was under director Vincent Selva that he did his first movie Youth, followed by Jithan, again under Vincent Selva. Mysskin made his directorial debut with the low – budget film Chithiram Pesudhadi which went on to become one of the biggest hits of the year. A simple love story, it became a hit owing to the unique style the film was written in. The leads, debutants Narain and Bhavana went on to become popular faces following the success. He then moved on to Anjathe which became one of the biggest blockbusters in Tamil Cinema. The film received critical acclaim for all departments of film making. The film was also noted for its narrative style and Mise-en-scène which marked an example of Tamil new wave cinema. It starred Narain, Prasanna, Vijayalakshmi Ahathian and yesteryear actor Pandiarajan in a never before seen role. Both the Mysskin films had his iconic yellow saree item numbers which became big hits and captured the hearts of the young and old alike.

Nevertheless, Mysskin came back with Nandalala a film loosely based on Takeshi Kitano's Kikujiro and it was completely different from his first two ventures. A film which dealt with a young boy and a mentally challenged person going in search of their respective mothers. He chose to play the mentally challenged character after the script was turned down by many established actors. The film went on to become his most critically acclaimed film with some critics calling it one of the best Tamil films ever made. Nandalala won the people's choice award at the Norway Film Festival. His next film, Yuddham Sei, a dark crime thriller was a hit at the box office as well. His visual style and directing prowess were appreciated and talked about by everybody. His next film, an commercial attempt at the superhero genre, Mugamoodi  received positive responses from the public and media. His next film Onaayum Aattukkuttiyum (The Wolf and the Lamb) was a fast-paced thriller released on 27 September 2013. It received superlative reviews from all corners. Audience and critics praised the film as a trendsetter and the changing face of Tamil cinema. Once again Mysskin proved that he was a director of high standards. In Onaayum Aattukkuttiyum, Mysskin also acted as one among the two lead characters, an antihero.

Pisaasu released on 19 December 2014 and became a major success, receiving critical acclaim for its sensible portrayal of the supernatural, horror, and romance. It was one of the biggest commercial hits of 2014 in Tamil cinema and proved to be the most profitable Tamil film for the year. His next film, Thupparivaalan a detective thriller starting Vishal in the lead, heavily inspired by Sherlock Holmes, was released on 14 September 2017.
In the film Savarakathi, which was released in 2018, he played as an antagonist opposite director Ram. The film was an average commercial success though praised by critics. He also had an important cameo in Thiagarajan Kumararaja's Super Deluxe which released on 29 March 2019. His latest film was Psycho, released on 24 January 2020 starring Udhayanidhi Stalin and Aditi Rao Hydari. The film was a critical and commercial success and redefined the clichéd whodunit genre.

Filmmaking
Mysskin is known for his peculiar combat sequences using elaborate storyboard and real unarmed martial strikes and stances; unconventional shots (like close-ups of feet); diegetic sound, light, silhouette and shadow; stage techniques (like monologue, face-floor, motion-freeze); staccato background score; meticulous scene and set construction; irony-laden dialogues; ellipses; minimalism; deep characterization (with archetypal hairdo, dress, accent, posture, gesture, locale, furniture); limited use of song choreography; and neo-noir renditions where the lead role is not infallible.

Mysskin is known to start film shoot only after a bound script is ready. He rigorously annotates his scripts with cues and camera lens focal lengths for each scene. He says that his films are influenced by the works of Akira Kurosawa. His plots predominantly deal with the urban poor and middle class. His films also have a recurring theme of compassion and redemption. His favorite directors are Robert Bresson, Melville, and Takeshi Kitano.

Filmography

 All films are in Tamil, unless otherwise noted.

As director, writer and actor

As singer

As music director

References

External links 
 

Tamil film directors
21st-century Indian film directors
Tamil screenwriters
Living people
Tamil playback singers
Male actors in Tamil cinema
Year of birth missing (living people)